Euonymus acanthocarpus is a species of flowering plant in the family Celastraceae. It is endemic to China. It has a scattered distribution in forest habitat.

This species is a shrub which can reach 8 meters tall, but is usually not more than 2 or 3. It has leathery leaves and inflorescences of many flowers. The flower is yellow-green and 6 to 8 millimeters wide. The fruit capsule is covered in prickles and contains seeds with orange arils.

Sources

acanthocarpus
Endemic flora of China
Near threatened plants
Taxonomy articles created by Polbot